Sohail Salim Abdul Rashid Khan (born 20 December 1970) is an Indian actor, writer, film director and producer who works mainly in Hindi cinema. He is the younger brother of actors Salman Khan and Arbaaz Khan. He has an elder sister, Alvira Khan Agnihotri. He produces films under his banner Sohail Khan Productions.

Early life
Khan was born in Bombay (present-day Mumbai) to screenwriter Salim Khan and his wife Sushila Charak who later changed her name to Salma Khan. He is the brother of actors Salman Khan and Arbaaz Khan. His paternal family is Muslim and is settled in Indore, Madhya Pradesh, while his mother is a Maharashtrian. His stepmother, Salim Khan's second wife, is actress Helen. His older brothers are Salman Khan and Arbaaz Khan, who was married to actress, VJ and host Malaika Arora. His sister Alvira Khan, is married to Bollywood director Atul Agnihotri, and his younger sister Arpita Khan collaborated with Sneha Ullal for his movie, which he produced with Sohail Khan Productions. Arpita is married to film actor Aayush Sharma.

Career
Khan started his career as a film producer and director making his directorial debut with the 1997 action thriller Auzaar, starring his brother Salman and Sanjay Kapoor. He then directed both of his brothers Salman and Arbaaz in the film Pyaar Kiya To Darna Kya (1998) and the less successful Hello Brother (1999) under his earlier banner "G.S. Entertainment".

In 2002, he wrote, produced, directed and made his acting debut in Maine Dil Tujhko Diya, which did average business at the box office. He then appeared in a few more films, none of which sold well. He had his first success with the film Maine Pyaar Kyun Kiya? (2005) in which he co-starred with his brother Salman Khan. He also wrote the story, produced and starred in the multi-starrer Fight Club - Members Only, which again did not do well at the box office. In 2006, due to a delayed release, the boxing drama Aryan, for which his performance was appreciated, failed to do well. In 2007, he produced another film Partner, which starred his brother Salman Khan and Govinda in the lead roles along with Lara Dutta and Katrina Kaif playing their love-interests, respectively.

Khan has also produced live stage shows in India and all over the world featuring various Indian film stars. His company also produced music videos and even made a foray into television with Chehre Pe Chehra, which was directed by Rishi Vohra. In 2008, he appeared in Hello and Heroes. In 2009, he co-starred with brother Arbaaz in Kisaan and featured in Main Aur Mrs Khanna and Do Knot Disturb. In 2010, he featured in Veer with brother Salman, released on 22 January 2010.

He returned to direction with the film Jai Ho, starring Salman Khan in the lead, which released in January 2014 to mixed reviews. In 2016, he directed Freaky Ali, starring Nawazuddin Siddiqui in the lead and brother Arbaaz in supporting role. In 2017, he returned to acting after seven years appearing alongside brother Salman once again in Tubelight.

In 2020, he purchased the franchise for the Lanka Premier League team Kandy Tuskers.

Personal life
Khan was married to Seema Sajdeh, a Punjabi Hindu, from 1998 to 2022. They had an Arya Samaj wedding before the nikkah. They have two sons, Nirvan and Yohan, (through surrogacy) sometimes also known as Aslam Khan (born June 2011).

Filmography

As actor

As producer

As writer

As director

Television appearances

References

External links

 
 
 
 Sohail Khan at Rotten Tomatoes

Living people
Indian male film actors
Indian male screenwriters
Film directors from Mumbai
Film producers from Mumbai
Hindi-language film directors
Male actors from Mumbai
Indian television producers
Indian people of Afghan descent
Indian people of Pashtun descent
Sohail
1969 births